James Ross Turpin (born 18 March 1997) is an English cricketer. Turpin is a right-arm medium bowler and right-handed batsman. He was born in Fowey, Cornwall, England.

Turpin made his first-class debut for Cardiff MCCU against Hampshire in April 2016.

References

External links

1997 births
Living people
English cricketers
Cornwall cricketers
Cardiff MCCU cricketers